Barbers Hill High School is a 5A school based in Mont Belvieu, Texas (USA). It is part of the Barbers Hill Independent School District located in western Chambers County. In 2015, the school was rated "Met Standard" by the Texas Education Agency.

Athletics
The Barbers Hill Eagles compete in the following sports:

Baseball
Basketball
Cross Country
Football
Golf
Soccer
Softball
Swimming and Diving
Tennis
Track and Field
Volleyball

State Champions
Baseball
2021(5A)
Softball
2021(5A)
Football
1971(1A)^ 1976(1A)
^Co-Champion with Sonora
Girls Basketball
1982(3A), 1983(3A), 1997(3A)
Boys Track
1935(All), 1956(B)
Individual
2014 World Association of Bencher and Deadlifters

Music
Barbers Hill High School is the home of the award-winning Soaring Eagle Marching Band. In the 2010 and 2011 marching seasons, the band received straight 1's for a first division rating at the UIL Region Marching Band Competition. The Soaring Eagle Marching Band was one of only 2 bands (the other being the Galena Park High School marching band) to receive this rating at the contest. In 2011 the Soaring Eagle Marching Band went on to the regional marching contest. In 2013, the Soaring Eagle Marching Band and 3 other schools in Area 4A went on to play at state in San Antonio. In the spring, the SEMB divides into 3 concert bands, the Barbers Hill High School Wind Ensemble (the premier performing group in the district), the BHHS Symphonic Band (middle performing group), and the BHHS Concert Band

State Champions
State Wind Ensemble:
1991(3A)

Drama & Theatre

State Champions
One Act Play 
1996 (3A) "Strider"
1999 (3A) "The Caucasian Chalk Circle"
2003 (3A) "Strider"
2010 (4A) "The Night Thoreau Spent In Jail"

Controversy 
In January 2020, student DeAndre Arnold was suspended and informed that he would be forbidden from attending graduation due to his dreadlocks. However, Arnold's family and political activists have asserted that the action taken against him was discriminatory. Other students of the high school also spoke out against the policy, describing it as gender discrimination, since girls are allowed to have long hair while boys are not.

References

External links
 

Public high schools in Texas
Schools in Chambers County, Texas
1929 establishments in Texas